The Crimea were a British indie band, based in Camden, London. The band were featured in John Peel's Festive Fifty, ranking higher than bands such as the White Stripes and all eleven of the initial album demos were played on his show. The Guardian has described the Crimea's songs as "mini-epics" that reduce frontman Davey MacManus to "spasms of jerking anguish". On 2 July 2013, they announced via their official Twitter account that they were calling time on their 11-years as a band and that their gig at the Jazz Café in London on 30 July 2013 would be their last.

History 
In 1998, the Crocketts signed to UK label V2 and released two albums. However, in late 2001, the band were dropped from the label's roster as part of a 'rationalisation' plan. Following this setback, Davey MacManus and Owen Hopkin formed the Crimea.

Their song "Lottery Winners on Acid" was played frequently by John Peel in 2002. They recorded a Peel session on 16 January 2003.

The Crimea were signed to Warner Bros Records following a showcase at the 2004 SXSW Festival in Texas. Their debut album, Tragedy Rocks, was released in 2005, with the first single from the album, "Lottery Winners on Acid", released on 9 January 2006; it entered the UK Singles Chart at No. 31 and became the first of three singles to appear as Single of the Week on what was then the show hosted by both Colin Murray and Edith Bowman on BBC Radio 1.  In support of the Crimea's second single, "White Russian Galaxy", the band then performed on Top of the Pops.

Due to poor album sales Warner Bros dropped the Crimea in late 2006. The band continued to write new material and in April 2007 released Secrets of the Witching Hour as a free download from the band's website; a CD was also available, with artwork by Joe Udwin, the band's bassist, in collaboration with London-based, visual artist Tersha Willis. The band received a lot of support from Radio 1 DJ, Colin Murray, who gave the Crimea airtime on his nightly show by playing one track from the album each week and advocating downloading the album.  The band hoped to tour substantially off the back of the new record.

The Crimea have toured with artists including Regina Spektor, Billy Corgan, Kings of Leon, Travis, Primal Scream, Stereophonics and Ash. During December 2006, the band played three dates in support of Snow Patrol on their UK arena tour ending at Wembley Arena. In May they also supported Modest Mouse on their short UK tour. In late 2007, the band supported Stereophonics on their UK tour.

In early 2008, their single "Loop a Loop" featured in a television advert for Trident gum.

Davey MacManus is the brother of Radio 1 DJ Annie Mac, who appears as backing vocals on their two records.

Secrets of The Witching Hour
From 30 April 2007, Secrets of the Witching Hour was available for free download at The Crimea's website; the original release date was set for 13 May 2007. As of 20 February 2013, the album has been downloaded 118,450 times. At midnight on 13 May 2007 the band performed an acoustic gig at the summit of Primrose Hill to celebrate the release of the album. Several of the songs on the CD version of the album feature spoken introductions by Regina Spektor. The free online version contains spoken interludes by Tywanna-Jo Baskette, a singer and songwriter from Oxford, Mississippi, US.

Square Moon
The Crimea's third studio album was released on 29 July 2013 as a double album containing 22 songs, jointly by Alcopop and Lazy Acre Records. In an interview with: "God is in the TV",  singer Davey MacManus spoke of his plan to go to Dieplsoot, a slum in South Africa to start a children's home. He has completed a nursing degree, and when volunteering in a clinic at a day centre for abused, sexually abused, orphaned, HIV and TB kids in 2012, he felt compelled to return and try to open a children's home, in order to protect the more at risk and sicker children he encountered.

Discography

Albums 
 Tragedy Rocks (2005)
 Secrets of the Witching Hour (2007)
 Square Moon (2013)

Singles 
 "Lottery Winners on Acid" (November 2002 - UK self-released)
 "White Russian Galaxy" (June 2003 - UK self-released)
 "Baby Boom" (November 2003 - UK self-released)
 "Lottery Winners on Acid" (9 January 2006 - UK Warner) UK No. 31
 "White Russian Galaxy" (April 2006 - UK Warner) UK No. 51
 "Baby Boom" (August 2006 - UK Warner)

The 2006 "Lottery Winners on Acid", "White Russian Galaxy" and "Baby Boom" singles are not re-issues, but new recordings with new b-sides.

Members
 Davey MacManus - Vocals, guitar, twangle
 Joe Udwin - Bass, backing vocals
 Andrew Stafford - Keyboards, backing vocals
 Owen Hopkin - Drums

Past members
 Andrew Norton - Lead Guitar 2004- 2007
 Julz Parker - Lead Guitar 2003

References

External links

British indie rock groups
Alcopop! Records artists